"White Tiger" is a 2015 song by English soul singer Izzy Bizu from the album A Moment of Madness.

It was featured in a 2018 commercial for Cacharel.

Track listing

Charts

References

External links 
 Music video on YouTube
 Page on Discogs
 Page on Official Charts

2015 songs
2015 singles
Izzy Bizu songs
Epic Records singles